Events in the year 1993 in Ukraine.

Incumbents 

 President: Leonid Kravchuk
 Prime Minister: Leonid Kuchma (until 22 September), Yukhym Zvyahilsky (from 22 September)

Events 

 3 September – The Massandra Accords were signed between Ukraine and the Russian Federation as result of negotiations that took place in the Massandra Palace at Yalta.

Deaths

References 

 
Ukraine
Ukraine
1990s in Ukraine
Years of the 20th century in Ukraine